Louis-Philippe Brodeur,  baptised Louis-Joseph-Alexandre Brodeur (August 21, 1862 – January 2, 1924) was a Canadian journalist, lawyer, politician, federal Cabinet minister, Speaker of the House of Commons of Canada, and puisne justice of the Supreme Court of Canada.

Life and career 
Born in Belœil, Quebec, he was first elected to the House of Commons of Canada in the 1891 election as Liberal Member of Parliament (MP) for Rouville, Quebec. He represented the riding continuously until his retirement prior to the 1911 election.

Brodeur was a firm supporter of Sir Wilfrid Laurier and came from a Rouges family. His father fought in the Lower Canada Rebellion of 1837, and his maternal grandfather was killed in the Rebellion's Battle of Saint-Charles.

As a young man, Brodeur studied law, graduating in 1884 with an LL.B. from the Université Laval in Montréal. He worked as a young lawyer with Honoré Mercier, before establishing his own law firm of Dandurand and Brodeuer with Raoul Dandurand. He also engaged in journalism for Liberal newspapers such as la Patrie and L'Électeur before becoming editor of Le Soir. He was first elected to the Canadian House of Commons at the age of 29. After the Liberals won the 1896 election, Brodeur was appointed deputy speaker. He was appointed as a Queen's Counsel in 1899. He became Speaker of the House of Commons of Canada following the 1900 election.

In 1904, he was appointed to the Laurier Cabinet as Minister of Inland Revenue where he introduced antitrust legislation to protect tobacco farmers from the monopolistic practices of the American Tobacco Company.

In 1906, he was promoted to Minister of Marine and Fisheries and reorganized the Montreal Harbours Commission and instituted reforms in the department to reduce patronage and corruption.

Brodeur was a member of the Canadian delegation to the 1907 Imperial Conference in London, and also helped negotiate a trade treaty with France.

In 1910, he became Minister of the Naval Service and was responsible for introducing legislation to create the Canadian Navy. This signified a move towards Canadian independence from Britain. It was opposed by the Conservative Party, which preferred Canada's participation in the Royal Navy. By the end of his term, the new Navy consisted of 233 sailors and two cruisers, one on each coast. The policy of creating a Canadian Navy was also opposed by French-Canadian nationalists such as Henri Bourassa who feared that the Canadian Navy would only be used as a device to engage Canada in British wars.

Supreme Court of Canada 
Prior to the 1911 election, Brodeur retired from politics and was appointed by Laurier to a seat on the Supreme Court of Canada. He retired from the court in 1923 to accept an appointment as the 13th Lieutenant Governor of Quebec. Brodeur died on the 2nd of January 1924, at the Lieutenant Governor's official residence of Spencer Wood in Sillery.

Family

Louis-Philippe Brodeur married Emma Brillon, daughter of J. R. (Joseph-Régnier) Brillon, of Belœil, P.Q.,
in June 1887. Their son, Victor, attained the rank of Rear Admiral in the Royal Canadian Navy. The École Victor-Brodeur in Esquimalt, British Columbia, is named after him. Victor's son Nigel attained the rank of Vice Admiral.

Archives 
There are Louis-Philippe Brodeur fonds at Library and Archives Canada and Bibliothèque et Archives nationales du Québec.

Electoral record 

By-election: On Mr. Brodeur being appointed Minister of Inland Revenue, 19 January 1904

References

External links 

 Supreme Court of Canada biography
 
 
 Works by Brodeur, L. P. (Louis-Philippe), 1862-1924 at The Online Books Page

Justices of the Supreme Court of Canada
Speakers of the House of Commons of Canada
Lieutenant Governors of Quebec
Liberal Party of Canada MPs
Members of the House of Commons of Canada from Quebec
Members of the King's Privy Council for Canada
Lawyers in Quebec
Canadian King's Counsel
1862 births
1924 deaths
Université de Montréal Faculty of Law alumni
Université Laval alumni
People from Beloeil, Quebec